Gossler Islands are a group of north–south trending islands  in extent, lying  west of Cape Monaco, Anvers Island, in the Palmer Archipelago off Antarctica. 

They were discovered and named by a German expedition under Eduard Dallmann, 1873–74, in honour of the Gossler banking family of Hamburg. The expedition was funded by the Deutsche Polar-Schifffahrtsgesellschaft shipping company, that was co-owned by Ernst Gossler (1838–1893), a grandson of Senator Johann Heinrich Gossler and a great-grandson of Johann Hinrich Gossler.

See also 
 List of Antarctic and sub-Antarctic islands

References

Islands of the Palmer Archipelago